As a nickname, Kip may refer to:

In arts and entertainment 

 Kip Anderson (1938–2007), American soul blues and R&B singer and songwriter
 Kip Fulbeck (born 1965), American artist, filmmaker and author
 Austin H. Kiplinger (1918-2015), American publisher and journalist
 Kip Pardue (born 1975), American actor
 Tod Williams (filmmaker) (born 1968), American director, producer and screenwriter

In sports 

 Kipkoech Cheruiyot (born 1964), retired middle-distance runner from Kenya
 Kipchoge Keino (born 1940), Kenyan retired middle- and long-distance runner
 Jason Kipnis (born 1987), American Major League Baseball player
 Bernard Lagat (born 1974), Kenyan-American middle- and long-distance athlete
 Kristopher McDaniel (born 1982), Canadian retired rower
 Kip Selbach (1872–1956), American Major League Baseball player
 Kip Taylor (1909–2002), American football player and college head coach
 Kip Wells (born 1977), American Major League Baseball pitcher
 Khairul Idham Pawi (born 1998), Malaysian motorcycle racer

In other fields 

 Kip Holden (born 1952), American politician
 Kip Rhinelander (1903–1936), New York socialite whose marriage to a biracial woman caused a sensation
 Kip Thorne (born 1940), American theoretical physicist
 Kip Tiernan (1926–2011), American social activist
 William E. Ward (born 1949), retired US Army lieutenant general

See also 

Lists of people by nickname